Steve Borst is an American television writer and producer. For his work on Mad, he was nominated for the Primetime Emmy Award for Outstanding Short Form Animated Program in 2012. He co-created Nickelodeon's Breadwinners with Gary "Doodles" DiRaffaele. His inspiration for the field of animation was CatDog from the network that produced Hey Dude and Double Dare that he grew up watching, Nickelodeon.

Career
Steve Borst lived in New York in 2003 when he became a writer and later head writer for Nick Creative Advertising, working on commercials, corporate presentations, live events, network branding, online commercials, on-air promos, print advertisements, promotional material, and public service announcements. Ever since he moved to Los Angeles in 2009, he has written episodes for Mad and Teen Titans Go! for Cartoon Network. He was head writer for Captain Cornelius Cartoon's Cartoon Lagoon in 2012. He co-created Breadwinners alongside Gary "Doodles" DiRaffaele from when they met at Burbank while working on Mad.

Filmography

Film

Television

References

External links

Year of birth missing (living people)
Living people
American television writers
American television producers
American television directors
Nickelodeon Animation Studio people